Kim Eun-kyung (born 7 June 1965) is a South Korean professor of commercial law at Hankuk University of Foreign Studies currently serving as the Senior Deputy Governor of Financial Supervisory Service - the first woman to assume its post since FSS was established in 1999. As one of three Senior Deputy Governors, she is managing its Consumer Finance and Protection Bureau.

She is reportedly regarded as an expert on consumer protection and insurance. She took various roles in Financial Supervisory Service and Financial Services Commission. She served as a board member of Korea Legal Aid Corporation and Traffic Accident Compensation Supervisory Service. Moreover, she was a member of Presidential Commission of Policy Planning.

Kim holds three degrees in law - bachelor's and master's from Hankuk University of Foreign Studies and doctorate from University of Mannheim. She has been teaching at her alma mater's law school from 2006.

References 

Living people
Hankuk University of Foreign Studies alumni
Academic staff of Hankuk University of Foreign Studies
1965 births
University of Mannheim alumni
South Korean women academics
South Korean government officials